Emilio Paolo Miraglia (1 January 1924 – 26 August 1982) was an Italian film director. He began working in film as a director's assistant and technician and worked on many B movies.

Miraglia is known for his two early 1970s giallo films, The Night Evelyn Came Out of the Grave and The Red Queen Kills Seven Times.

Filmography
Assassination (1967)
Frame Up (1968)
The Vatican Affair (1968)
The Night Evelyn Came Out of the Grave (1971) 
Joe Dakota (1972)
The Red Queen Kills Seven Times (1972)

References

External links

1924 births
1982 deaths
Giallo film directors
Italian film directors
People from the Province of Lecce